Tengah is a planning area and future HDB town located within the West Region of Singapore. It is bound by Choa Chu Kang to the northeast, Jurong East and Jurong West to the south, Bukit Batok to the east and the Western Water Catchment to its west and north.

Formerly a military restricted area, Tengah is currently reserved for future housing developments, making it Singapore's newest Housing and Development Board town since the development of Punggol in the 1990s.

After the demilitarisation of the military training area at Tengah, the first estate, Plantation Grove, was launched in Tengah in November 2018. Tengah is divided into various districts, namely Plantation, Park, Garden, Market Place, Forest Hill and Brickland Districts.

The southwestern portion of Tengah will be developed as part of the Jurong Innovation District, a newer industrial development compared to Jurong Industrial Estate.

Etymology
Before urbanization took place, south of Tengah was previously known as "Hong Kah", a Chinese kampong located just slightly north of present-day Jurong West. A neighbourhood of the same name within Jurong West, continues to retain this appellation. Southzone will relocate discharges there. Also, there was a Malay kampong known as Kampong Ulu Jurong, just opposite of Hong Kah Village along Jurong Road.

In the old maps, the area appears as Tengeh or Tengah. In Malay, the word Tengah means "centre", "central" or "middle". The name may be taken from the nearby Sungei Tengah (Malay for Tengah River).

History
In the 1980s, under the government's resettlement plan, the residents of Hong Kah Village and Kampong Ulu Jurong were relocated to nearby towns newly built by the government, particularly into the present Jurong Green, Jurong Spring and Bukit Batok areas. Schools were shifted elsewhere and one example is Xingnan Primary School, which used to operate at a temple along "Hong Kah Road" at the village. The HDB estates of Jurong Green and Jurong Spring are given the name "Hong Kah", probably meaning that most of the villagers resettled there. When the village was cleared, the PIE and KJE projects started in the area, leading to the creation of "Jurong West Avenue 2" that brought about the rise of both Jurong West New Town and Choa Chu Kang New Town. The western part became inaccessible to the public first in 1996 and was used by the military for training activities (which is west of Jurong Road Track 22), followed by the eastern part of Hong Kah (which is east of Jurong Road Track 22) in 2005.

In the past, there were several village roads that used to serve the area. Roads such as Hong Kah Road/Lane/Drive/Circle, Sing Nan Road, Kian Hong Road, Jalan Keladan, Jalan Beka, Jalan Pelawan, Jalan Jelawi, Jalan Sena, Lorong Putek, Jalan Buey, Jalan Mandar and Jalan Ara. The last few roads, such as Jalan Lam Sam and Jalan Chichau existed till January 2019. Therefore, these two roads were expunged. Jurong Road closed on 27 September 2020 and is being replaced by Tengah Way and Tengah Drive.

Transport
This area will be connected to the Jurong Region MRT line in 2027, with MRT stations Tengah, Tengah Plantation and Tengah Park servicing the area, and a new integrated transport hub will also be ready by 2022.

Military use
The bigger part of the former Hong Kah Village was an SAF military training area until 10 November 2015. The military training around the area was gradually shifted to Ama Keng Road and training for Keat Hong Camp were now trained at Ama Keng. Massive construction and earthworks subsequently began in October 2015.

References

Places in Singapore